Nick Eubanks (born November 21, 1996) is an American football tight end who is a free agent. He played college football at Michigan and was signed by the Dallas Cowboys as an undrafted free agent in 2021.

Early life and education
Nick Eubanks was born on November 21, 1996, in Plantation, Florida. He attended American Heritage School there, being ranked the ninth-best tight end and a four-star recruit upon graduation. He accepted a scholarship offer from University of Michigan following his senior year of high school. He made his debut on September 10, 2016, against UCF. As a sophomore in 2017, Eubanks played four games, starting one, before suffering an injury. He recorded two receptions for 61 yards in his four appearances.

As a junior, Eubanks played in all 13 games and started four, making eight catches for 157 yards. He also scored his first career touchdown during this season, earning his second varsity letter. Against Indiana on November 10, he caught a 41-yard pass for his first and longest career score. He earned a starting role as a senior, starting 10 out of a possible 13 games, and making 25 catches for 234 yards and four touchdowns. He was named honorable mention All-Big Ten following the season. He returned to Michigan in 2020, and started four games, leading all Michigan tight ends with 10 receptions for 117 yards and one score.

Professional career

Dallas Cowboys
After going unselected in the 2021 NFL Draft, Eubanks was signed as an undrafted free agent by the Dallas Cowboys. He was waived on August 31.

Philadelphia Eagles
Eubanks was signed to the practice squad of the Philadelphia Eagles two days later. He was released from the practice squad on October 11.

Detroit Lions
On November 9, 2021, Eubanks was signed to the Detroit Lions practice squad.

Cincinnati Bengals
Eubanks was signed by the Cincinnati Bengals on April 5, 2022. He was released by the team on August 30, 2022.

Houston Texans
On October 5, 2022, Eubanks was signed to the Houston Texans practice squad. He was released on October 11.

References

Further reading
 
 

1996 births
Living people
Players of American football from Florida
American football tight ends
Michigan Wolverines football players
Dallas Cowboys players
Philadelphia Eagles players
Detroit Lions players
Cincinnati Bengals players
American Heritage School (Florida) alumni
People from Plantation, Florida
Houston Texans players